Yelniki is a rural locality (a village) in Dobryansky District, Perm Krai, Russia. The population was 4 as of 2010. There are 11 streets.

Geography 
Yelniki is located 47 km south of Dobryanka (the district's administrative centre) by road. Krasnaya Sludka is the nearest rural locality.

References 

Rural localities in Dobryansky District